The nocturnal bottleneck hypothesis is a hypothesis to explain several mammalian traits. In 1942, Gordon Lynn Walls described this concept which states that placental mammals were mainly or even exclusively nocturnal through most of their evolutionary history, starting with their origin 225 million years ago, and only ending with the demise of the non-avian dinosaurs 66 million years ago. While some mammal groups have later evolved to fill diurnal niches, the approximately 160 million years spent as nocturnal animals has left a lasting legacy on basal anatomy and physiology, and most mammals are still nocturnal.

Evolution of mammals

Mammals evolved from cynodonts, a group of superficially dog-like synapsids in the wake of the Permian–Triassic mass extinction. The emerging archosaurian groups that flourished after the extinction, including crocodiles and dinosaurs and their ancestors, drove the remaining larger cynodonts into extinction, leaving only the smaller forms. The surviving cynodonts could only succeed in niches with minimal competition from the diurnal dinosaurs, evolving into the typical small-bodied insectivorous dwellers of the nocturnal undergrowth. While the early mammals continued to develop into several probably quite common groups of animals during the Mesozoic, they all remained relatively small and nocturnal.

Only with the massive extinction at the end of the Cretaceous did the dinosaurs leave the stage open for the establishment of a new fauna of mammals. Despite this, mammals continued to be small-bodied for millions of years. While all the largest animals alive today are mammals, the majority of mammals are still small nocturnal animals.

Mammalian nocturnal adaptions

Several different features of mammalian physiology appear to be adaptations to a nocturnal lifestyle, mainly related to the sensory organs. These include:

Senses
 Acute sense of hearing, including coiling cochleae, external pinnae and auditory ossicles.
 Very good sense of smell, well developed nasal turbinates. Most have a large olfactory bulb.
 Well-developed sense of touch, particularly the whiskers. 
 With the exception of higher primates, very large cornea, giving a less acute visual image compared to birds and reptiles.
 Limited colour vision.

Physiology
 Endothermia that enabled early mammals to become independent of solar radiation and environmental factors.
 Unique type of brown adipose tissue, allowing mammals to generate heat quickly.
 Mitochondria with respiration rates five to seven times higher than those of reptiles of similar size.
 Fur to assist in thermo-regulation in a cold (night) environment.
 Lack of an ocular shielding mechanism against (diurnal) ultraviolet light.
Loss of the ability to produce gadusol, a chemical which protects against the sun.
 The photolyase DNA mechanism, which relies on visible light, does not work in the placental mammals, despite being present and functional in bacteria, fungi, and most other animals.

Behaviour
 Circadian rhythm and behaviour patterns in all basal groups are nocturnal, at least in placentals.
 Burrowing lifestyle allowing sheltering from climate and diurnal predators appears to be a basal mammalian trait.

References

Behavioral ecology
Biology theories
Chronobiology
Circadian rhythm
Evolutionary biology
Night
Prehistoric mammals
Sleep